Kodumthara is a village just outside Pathanamthitta City Suburbs, located in Kerala state, India.

.
Kodumthara is only 2 km away from Pathanamthitta

The village is famous for the ancient Subrahmanya Temple.

The temple is visited by devotees from various parts of Kerala.

From Pathanamthitta, one can take a public bus to Thazhoorkadavu or Vallicode Kottayam to reach Kodumthara.

Bus services are available frequently.

See also
 Vazhamuttom
 Thazhoor Bhagavathy Kshetram(temple)
 Vallicode
 Pathanamthitta District
 River Achankovil
 Temples of Kerala

References

Villages in Pathanamthitta district